The Auroa Helicopters Auroa is a New Zealand helicopter designed and produced by Auroa Helicopters Limited of Manaia, Taranaki, introduced in 2013. The aircraft is supplied complete and ready-to-fly.

Design and development
The Auroa was designed to comply with the New Zealand and European Class 6 microlight helicopter rules. It features a single main rotor and tail rotor, a two-seats-in side-by-side configuration enclosed cockpit with a windshield, skid landing gear and a   Solar T62 turbine engine.

The aircraft fuselage is made from a combination of metal tubing and composites. The tail rotor has four blades and a protective ring.

Reviewer Werner Pfaendler, describes the design as "elegant".

First flown in 2011, the three prototypes accumulated 130 flying hours by the end of that year.

Specifications (Auroa)

See also
List of rotorcraft

References

External links

Animation tour of the Auroa

Auroa
2010s New Zealand sport aircraft
2010s New Zealand ultralight aircraft
2010s New Zealand civil utility aircraft
2010s New Zealand helicopters
Aircraft first flown in 2011
Single-turbine helicopters